George L. Trayser (1808 – 1881) was a German-born American piano maker. He emigrated to the United States in 1849, and made pianos in Indianapolis and Richmond, Indiana. His pianos—due to their high quality and rich, resonant tone and responsive action—had a reputation as instruments suitable for school and concert work.

Early life (1808–1865)
Trayser was born in 1808 in Hesse-Darmstadt, Prussia which later became Darmstadt, Germany.
Trayser apprenticed in piano making in German piano factories near Darmstadt. He married in Germany, and two sons were born  in Neuchâtel, Switzerland:
Frederick L. was born in 1840 and Paul was born in 1842.  Trayser owned a piano company in Switzerland.

The family emigrated to the United States in 1849 and settled initially in Newport, Kentucky.
Trayser started a small factory in Covington, Kentucky (Traeyser & Co.), and had Morse & Guernsey as consignment agents in Louisville, Kentucky in 1851. Trayser was granted his first patent for an upright piano in Cincinnati in 1853. Trayser traded in and repaired pianos. At some point the spelling of the original family surname of "Traeyser" was changed to "Trayser", likely at the time of naturalization if not earlier.

His younger brother Phillip, who lived in Baltimore, signed a guarantee for $1,000 in October 1853. Trayser struggled financially and was insolvent 1854-1856.  There were lawsuits about his debts until 1862. John A. Skiff was a sales agent for Skiff & Trayser pianos in Cincinnati, Ohio in 1854. In 1857, the Covington, Kentucky factory was destroyed in a fire, and Trayser moved to Louisville, Kentucky.

In 1858, Trayser was a witness in an extensive church dispute in Louisville, Kentucky.  It was apparent that customers took
advantage of Trayser, especially in written contracts, because Trayser did not yet read English.  He was competent to hear and speak English in the trial.

Trayser moved to Indianapolis in 1859.  He paid a manufacturing license tax to the state of Indiana in May 1864 in Indianapolis. He also partnered with Col. William J. H. Robinson to form Trayser, Robinson & Co. in 1865.

Building pianos (1865–1876)

His pianos—due to their high quality and rich, resonant tone and responsive action—had a reputation as instruments suitable for school and concert work.

Trayser moved the family to  Maysville, Kentucky in 1865 and founded the Trayser Piano Forte Co. M. J. Chase was the President and General Manager, and G. Bambach, Jr. was Secretary. George Trayser made and supervised construction of the pianos. Trayser also sold his pianos in Ripley, Ohio until 1871.

Trayser moved his family to Richmond, Indiana in 1865 except for his son Frederick, who lived most of his life in Maysville, Kentucky. George L. Trayser became a naturalized US citizen in 1866. Trayser was granted another patent for upright piano in Indianapolis in 1867 and established the Trayser Piano Company in 1869 in Richmond, Indiana.

In 1872 the Starr Piano Company was founded as the Trayser Piano Company, co-founded by James Starr. In 1878, Benjamin Starr joined his brother James and the company was reorganized as the Chase Piano Company. They bought land in Richmond, Indiana in 1884 and constructed the buildings, renaming the business Starr Piano Company in 1893.
In 1873 Frederick was granted a patent for piano action in Maysville.  He was listed in the Maysville city directory in 1876. In 1875 George Trayser was granted another piano patent in Richmond.
In 1876 the family resided at 43 N. Pearl, while the Trayser Piano Company was at 145 N. 5th. In a blind vote contest in Cincinnati on 10 June 1876, there were 73 votes for Trayser and 43 for Steinway. In a blind vote contest at Lyceum Hall in Richmond on 8 September 1876, the vote was 120 for Trayser and 70 for Steinway.

Growing the companies (1876–1881)
In October 1876 the Trayser Piano Company had rooms in Lyceum Hall for offices and warerooms, sharing those rooms with Hoosier Organ Co. and Professor Rhu, music teacher. In October 1876 construction began on a new piano factory.  It was 80' x 125' and 3.5 stories built in the location of the old woolen mills. In September 1877 the Valley Gem of Ripley, Ohio merged into Trayser Piano Company (including M. J. Chase and 16 workmen). The Trayser Piano Company made the Trayser upright, the Valley Gem Scale and the Chase Square Grand.

November 1877 marked the opening of the Trayser-Chase ware rooms at Main and Pearl in Richmond. George Trayser withdrew from making pianos in 1878 at age 70. In 1878 the family resided at 85 S. 6th, while in 1879 the family resided at 45 N. Washington. His son Paul started the Richmond Piano Company in 1879.

Successors (1878–1950)
In 1878 the Trayser Piano Company was subsumed into the Chase Piano Company in Richmond. In 1884 the Chase Piano Company became the James M Starr & Company and by 1893 all the above companies merged into the Starr Piano Company. This company continued making pianos in Richmond until the 1950s.

Military service
Paul Trayser served in the Civil War as a bugler in a Kentucky regiment.

Death and legacy
George Trayser died in 1881 in Richmond, Indiana, at the age of 73. Trayser is best known for making pianos.

Gallery

References

External links
 The Starr-Gennett Foundation has a history of Starr Piano Company and its successors.
 George Trayser: a Family Tribute has clippings of above newspaper sources, as well as many more photos.

1808 births
1881 deaths
Businesspeople from Darmstadt
Hessian emigrants to the United States
Piano manufacturing companies of the United States
Defunct companies based in Indiana
People with acquired American citizenship